Curtains is the third studio album by English indie rock band Tindersticks, released on 24 June 1997.

Track listing
 "Another Night In"  – 5:11
 "Rented Rooms"  – 5:12
 "Don't Look Down"  – 4:18
 "Dick's Slow Song"  – 4:09
 "Fast One"  – 1:52
 "Ballad of Tindersticks"  – 7:37
 "Dancing"  – 2:56
 "Let's Pretend"  – 3:21
 "Desperate Man"  – 3:21
 "Buried Bones"  – 4:03 (duet with Ann Magnuson)
 "Bearsuit"  – 2:11
 "(Tonight) Are You Trying to Fall in Love Again"  – 3:07
 "I Was Your Man"  – 3:39
 "Bathtime"  – 4:03
 "Walking"  – 5:25
 "A Marriage Made in Heaven"  – 5:16  (Bonus track on US London Records issue - duet with Isabella Rossellini)

References

1997 albums
Tindersticks albums